Astraeus flavopictus is a species of beetle in the jewel beetle family, Buprestidae, found in Australia.

It was first described by Hippolyte Louis Gory and Francis de Laporte de Castelnau in 1837 from a specimen taken from the Swan River.

Adult beetles are associated with Jacksonia species.

References

External links 
 Astraeus flavopictus: images & occurrence data from Atlas of Living Australia

Buprestidae
Beetles described in 1837
Beetles of Australia
Taxa named by François-Louis Laporte, comte de Castelnau
Taxa named by Hippolyte Louis Gory